Gordon R. Dickson's SF Best is a collection of science fiction stories by Gordon R. Dickson.  It was first published by Dell in 1978 and was edited by James R. Frenkel.  The stories originally appeared in the magazines Analog Science Fiction and Fact, Fantasy and Science Fiction, Satellite and If.

Contents

 Introduction - The Quiet Giant, by Spider Robinson
 Foreword, by James R. Frenkel
 "Hilifter"
 "Brother Charlie"
 "Act of Creation"
 "Idiot Solvant"
 "Call Him Lord"
 "Tiger Green"
 "Of the People"
 "Dolphin’s Way"
 "In the Bone"
 Gordon R. Dickson Bibliography

References

Sources

1978 anthologies
Short story collections by Gordon R. Dickson